Alois Vojtěch Šembera, also Alois Adalbert Sembera or Alois Adalbert Schembera (March 21, 1807 – March 23, 1882) was a Czech linguist, historian of literature, writer, journalist and patriot.

Life and work
He was born  in Vysoké Mýto, Bohemia, Austrian Empire. During 1819–1826 he studied at the gymnasium in Litomyšl, during 1826/27 philology at the Charles University in Prague and then law at the same university (1827–1830).

Between 1830 and 1839 he worked as municipal lawyer in Brno (Moravia) and gave there private lessons to the children of local nobility. During 1839–1847 he taught Czech language and literature at the University of Olomouc. Between 1847 and 1849 Šembera supervised the Moravian provincial archive. During years of 1848/49 he was an editor of Moravské noviny ("Moravian Newspaper"). In 1849 he was named professor of Czech language and literature at a University of Vienna.

Šembera was an active participant of the Czech National Revival. In 1839 he asserted to use Czech names for the streets in Brno, later in Olomouc, encouraged use of the Czech language and preservation of historical landmarks in the country. He initially believed in authenticity of manuscripts of Dvůr Králové and of Zelená Hora but later turned against them being rewarded by enmity of Czech nationalists.

Šembera died in Vienna, Austria-Hungary, on March 23, 1882.

Works
 Historie pánů z Boskovic ("History of the Lords of Boskovice"), 1836.
 Vpád Mongolů do Moravy ("Incursion of Mongols into Moravia"), 1842. 
 Über die Gleichstellung der beiden Landessprachen in Mähren ("About equality of both languages of Moravia"), 1848, written in German.
 Dějiny řeči a literatury českoslovanské. Věk starší. Od r. 58 př. Kr. do r. 1409 po Kr. ("History of Bohemian-Slavonic language and literature until 1409"), 1858.
 Paměti a znamenitosti města Olomouc ("History and landmarks of Olomouc"), 1861.
 Dějiny řeči a literatury českoslovanské. Věk novější. Od r. 1409 až do r. 1868 ("History of Bohemian-Slavonic language and literature since 1409 to 1868"), 1868.
 Obyvatelstvo české a německé na Moravě ("Czech and German inhabitants of Moravia"), 1873.
 Kdo sepsal Královédvorský rukopis roku 1817? ("Who wrote the Manuscript of Dvůr Králové in 1817?"), Vienna, 1880.

Literature
 Emanuel Škorpil: Alois Vojtěch Šembera, přehled života a díla (Alois Vojtěch Šembera, overview of life and work), Vysoké Mýto, 1946. 
 Eva Straková: Alois Vojtěch Šembera a jeho vídeňské působení (Alois Vojtěch Šembera and his activity in Vienna), 2006, diploma work, Masaryk University.
 Vysoké Mýto Regional Museum owns a collection of materials related to Šembera and is publishing his correspondence (5 volumes as of 2007 ).

External links 
 Short biography (in Czech)

1807 births
1882 deaths
19th-century Czech people
19th-century linguists
Linguists from the Czech Republic
Czech expatriates in Austria
Czech nationalists
People from Vysoké Mýto
Academic staff of Palacký University Olomouc